Náátsʼihchʼoh National Park Reserve is a Canadian national park reserve encompassing parts of the South Nahanni River watershed in the Northwest Territories. The name means "stands like a porcupine" in the Dene language. The two areas are to be managed separately, similar to Banff and Jasper National Parks which are also side by side. The South Nahanni watershed is home to several endangered species, including grizzly bears and boreal woodland caribou. The area is also known for its moose, Dall sheep and the northernmost population of mountain goats in Canada.

Features
'Náátsʼihchʼoh National Park Reserve is within the Mackenzie Mountains. The park takes its name from Náátsʼįhchʼoh (Mount Wilson) at the north end of the park. “ Náátsʼįhchʼoh” is the Shúhtagot’ine language description of this mountain and it refers to its unique shape, which is sharp and pointed on the top like a porcupine quill. This area has been travelled and valued for hunting and its cultural importance by the Shúhtaot’ine (Mountain Dene, a Sahtu group) of the Tulita District. The mountain from which the park takes its name is credited with great powers.

The main rivers running through this area are the South Nahanni River (Tehjeh Deé), and the Broken Skull River which merges with the South Nahanni. Paddlers can descend the South Nahanni River's "rock garden" starting at Nááts’įhch’oh Tué (Moose Ponds), or take the less technical Broken Skull River.

Park creation
The intention to create a park reserve was announced by the federal government on April 7, 2008, with establishment to follow a negotiated impact and benefit plan between the government and the Sahtu Dene and Métis. The government signed a Memorandum of Understanding with the "Sahtú organizations (land corporations) established under the land claim agreement representing the Dene and Métis of the Tulita District." The Government contributed $500,000 to assist the land corporations and help aboriginal communities develop an impact and benefit plan. The area is becoming industrialized with "roads, pipelines, exploration for minerals, oil and natural gas, and development of mines and wells." The park will prohibit the opening of new mines, but existing claims will be respected. Originally, the land was meant to be used for an extension of Nahanni National Park Reserve, but the Dene and Métis people in the Sahtu Region lobbied for a plan that would make their area of land different from Nahanni, which is claimed by the Dene of the Dehcho Region.

The official announcement was made on April 7, 2008 by Federal Environment Minister John Baird who said, "with this historic agreement announced today, we are once again taking action to protect Canada's North for future generations." It was the fifth conservation related announcement made by the government within a year.

Following the announcement, three plans for the park boundaries were proposed. The region is known for its mineral potential, and mining companies were concerned that the park would limit their access to these minerals. The first scenario would have made the park , protected 94 per cent of the upper watershed of the South Nahanni River, 95 percent of the grizzly bear habitat and 81 percent of the woodland caribou summer habitat, leaving 20 per cent of the overall mineral potential outside of the park's boundaries and potentially available for development. The Government of Canada chose the third option for the final park boundary that leaves 70 per cent of the overall mineral potential outside the park while retaining 70 percent of the grizzly bear habitat and 44 percent of the summer calving grounds of the woodland caribou herd within the park boundary." During negotiations, concerns were raised about the impact that mining the region would have on the South Nahanni watershed. Mining industry representatives, however, said "even the third option would limit access to areas with big potential for development. But of the three plans it was their preferred choice. They said mining could be carried out in environmentally sustainable ways and it would bring economic benefits to local residents."

In March 2012, federal, Dene and Métis representatives signed an impact and benefit plan for the park reserve. That August, Prime Minister Stephen Harper visited the area, and announced the reserve's boundaries and its establishment, which was realized just over two years later, on December 18, 2014, following passage of legislation under the National Parks Act. Nááts'ihch'oh thus became the eighth National Park Reserve in the national park system. Official announcements gave no indication of when the reserve—or its neighbour, Nahanni—would gain full national park status.

See also
 List of national parks of Canada

References

External links 
 Parks Canada. Nááts'ihch'oh National Park Reserve
 Parks Canada Final Consultation Report, August 2010 depicting the three different area options

National parks in the Northwest Territories
Parks in the Northwest Territories
Protected areas established in 2014
2014 establishments in the Northwest Territories